Hwang Ji-u is a Korean poet and art critic.

Life
Hwang Ji-u was born in Jeollanam-do in 1952. He studied Aesthetics at Seoul National University and Philosophy at Sogang University. Hwang Ji-u is a native of Haenam at the southernmost tip of the Korean Peninsula. He developed a deep interest in poetry while majoring in aesthetics and philosophy at college and graduate school. While active in literary circles in college, he participated in several anti-government protests and was forcefully drafted into military service. After being discharged from the army, he was expelled from university for his involvement in anti- government activities and was subjected to imprisonment and torture. The agonies and passions of his younger years are demonstrated in undertones throughout his poems, and artistically, if also painfully, sublimated against the background of the political conditions of his era. Hwang has worked as a Professor in the Department of Creative Writing, Hansin University.

Work
The poetry of Hwang Ji-u's poetry is distinguished by both its intricate, exquisitely lyrical descriptions of human sensuality and its frustration and anxiety towards reality. Therefore, his poetry contains a binary texture, as both coarse and delicate. Another distinguishing characteristic of Hwang's poetry is its strong political consciousness. Hwang Jiu largely uses two methods to deliver his political message, in the coded symbolism of "Kkonmal," and the satire and sarcasm of "Geunhwang" and "Bat" (Bakjwi). The latter method is commonly employed in other political or propagandistic poetry, though Hwang's usage is unique in its origin in the poet's own experience, which ultimately leads the imagination of readers. The poet is currently interested in Buddhist philosophy (Mireuk Sasang) and its literary influence. Hwang Ji-u's other collections of poetry include “Birds Fly Away Too” (Saedeuldo sesangeul tteuneunguna), "From Winter Trees to Spring Trees", and "Genun sogui yeonkkot."

Works in translation
 Even Birds Leave the World (황지우 시선집)
 Die Schatten der Fische (황지우 시선집 )
 Би Бол Чи Юм (황지우 시선-나는 너다) (황지우 시선-나는 너다)
 El tiempo transparente (한국시선) 
 No brilla la luz verdadera (어느날 나는 흐린 주점에 앉아 있을 거다)
 De L'Hiver-de-L'Arbre Au Printemps-de-L'Arbre (황지우 시선집 )

Works in Korean (partial)
 Birds Also Appear Among Us (1983
 From the Winter Trees to the Spring Trees (1985)
 I am You (Pulbit Publishers, 1987)
 Lotus in the Eye of the Crab (1991)
 One Day I Will Sit in a Dimly-Lit Bar (1999)

Awards
 New Spring Literary Contest Prize (1980)
 The Kim Suyeong Literary Award (1983)
 Sowol Poetry Prize (1983)
 Contemporary Literature Award (1983)
 Daesan Literary Awards (1999)

References

External links
  Hwang Ji-u at Doosan Encyclopedia

1952 births
Korean writers
Living people
Seoul National University alumni
Sogang University alumni
Academic staff of Korea National University of Arts